Shin Hyun-joon (born October 28, 1968) is a South Korean actor. He is best known for his roles in Barefoot Ki-bong, Stairway to Heaven and the Marrying the Mafia sequels, and as the photographer in the popular music video "Because I'm A Girl" by KISS. In the Korean press he is nicknamed as 아랍왕자 ("Prince of Arab") due to his foreign look and long eyelashes.

Career
Shin Hyun-joon was an athletics major at Yonsei University before starting a career in modeling and acting in 1989. His film debut came in director Im Kwon-taek's Son of a General series, set under the Japanese occupation in the 1920s. For the first half of the 1990s he continued working with Im Kwon-taek and also acted in Hwa-Om-Kyung, Jang Sun-woo's award-winning film based on the Avatamsaka Sutra.

In recent years Shin has turned more towards popular cinema, finding his greatest success in fantasy/sci-fi works such as The Gingko Bed, The Soul Guardians, and the Korean-Chinese co-production Bichunmoo, as well as gangster comedies Marrying the Mafia II and Guns & Talks. In one of his most iconic roles, Shin played a 40-year-old marathon runner with the mental faculties of an 8-year-old boy in Barefoot Ki-bong.

A devout Christian, he published a photo-essay book Shin Hyun-joon's Confessions in 2008, which documented his personal insights about life and faith. The first printing sold out in two days, and the book was also released in China and Japan. Confessions contained a foreword by international star Jackie Chan as well as religious testimonies by other Korean celebrities such as Choi Ji-woo, Kim Won-hee and Nam Hee-seok. He is also known for his missionary work, charitable endeavors and volunteerism.

Aside from his job as an actor, Shin currently hosts the entertainment news program Entertainment Weekly on KBS2, the KBS Nine O'Clock News segment KBS Entertainment 925 on KBS1, and the Channel A talk show Show King. He has written two children's books: Aladdin and the Magic Lamp (2012) and Clown with Smiles and Tears (2013). He is also an acting professor at Induk University since March 2010.

Shin established the production company HJ Film and is the CEO of 3J Cosmetics.

Personal life

Shin married Kim Kyung-mi (Linda Kim), a Korean American woman 12 years his junior, at the Grand Hyatt Seoul on May 26, 2013. His wife studied for a doctorate in music in the U.S., and Shin said on his show Entertainment Weekly that he bumped into her in the doorway of a building and fell in love with her at first sight.

The couple has three children.

Filmography

Film
 Ghost Police (TBA) 
 George and Bong-shik (TBA)
 The Assassin (2023) as Lee Nan  
 Handsome (2022) as Mi-nam 
 Bad Guys Always Die (2015)
 Marrying the Mafia IV (2011)
 Sin of a Family (2011)
 Kill Me (2009)
 His Last Gift (2008)
 The Worst Guy Ever (2007)
 Master Kims (2007)
 Hot for Teacher (2006)
 Marrying the Mafia III (2006)
 Barefoot Ki-bong (2006)
 Shadowless Sword (2005)
 Marrying the Mafia II (2005)
 Hi! Dharma 2: Showdown in Seoul (2004)
 Face (2004)
 Blue (2003)
 Once Upon a Time in a Battlefield (2003)
 Guns & Talks (2001)
 Siren (2000)
 Bichunmoo (2000)
 The Soul Guardians (1998)
 The Story of a Man (1998)
 KK Family List (1997)
 Maria and the Inn (1997)
 Lament (1997)
 The Gingko Bed (1996)
 Channel 69 (1996)
 Hong Gil-dong (animated, 1995)
 The Taebaek Mountains (1994)
 Love is Oh Yeah! (1993)
 Hwa-Om-Kyung (1993)
 General's Son III (1992)
 General's Son II (1991)
 Portrait of the Days of Youth (1991)
 General's Son (1990)

Television series
Showtime Begins! (MBC, 2022) – Special appearance
Moorim School: Saga of the Brave (KBS2, 2016)
Butterfly (MTV, 2013)
Ohlala Couple (KBS2, 2012)
Bridal Mask (KBS2, 2012) 
Dummy Mommy (SBS, 2012)
Road No. 1 (MBC, 2010) – cameo
Cain and Abel (SBS, 2009)
Star's Lover (SBS, 2008) – cameo
Rondo (TBS, 2006)
Stairway to Heaven (SBS, 2003)
I Love You! I Love You! (SBS, 1998)
White Nights 3.98 (SBS, 1998)
Wedding Dress (KBS2, 1997)
The Brothers' River (SBS, 1996)
1.5 (MBC, 1996)
Sons of the Wind (KBS2, 1995)

Variety show
  God of Lawyer''' (2022, Host) Bangka Road (SBS FiL , 2021–present) KBS Entertainment 925 (KBS1, 2013–2019) – AnchorShow King (Channel A, 2011–present) – MCEntertainment Weekly (KBS2, 2010–2019) – MCEnjoy Today (MBC, 2010-2011) – MCThe Dreaming Sea (KBS2, 2013) – MemberRural Police (MBC every1, 2017-2018) – Member, seasons 1-4Family Outing My Daughter's MenMusic video appearances
Zi-A – "Choked With Grief" (2008)
Zi-A – "I'm Happy" (2008)
Zi-A – "I Love You, I'm Sorry" (2008)
Zi-A – "Guardian Angel" (2007)
Zi-A – "Together with a Star in My Heart" (2007)
Zi-A – "Absentmindedly" (2007)
KISS – "Because I'm a Girl" (2001)
Lee Soo-young – "Never Again" (2001)
Jo Sung-mo – "For Your Soul" (1999)
Lee Seung-chul – 말리꽃 (1999)
Bobby Kim – "Remember Last Christmas" (1998)

BooksClown with Smiles and Tears (2013)Aladdin and the Magic Lamp (2012)
배우 연기를 훔쳐라 (2012) Shin Hyun-joon's Confessions (2008)

Recognition
2022: Anti-phishing voice ambassador for Korea National Police Agency 
2010: Goodwill Ambassador for Korea National Red Cross
2010: Goodwill Ambassador for Grain Welfare Foundation
2010: Goodwill Ambassador for World No Tobacco Day
2010: Goodwill Ambassador for the 1004 Marathon Relay for Disabled People
2010: Goodwill Ambassador for the 2010 Bible EXPO 
2008: Goodwill Ambassador for South Korea's World Refugee Day 
2007: Goodwill Ambassador for the 7th World Paralympic Games

Awards
2012 KBS Drama Awards– Excellence Award, Actor in a Miniseries (Ohlala Couple)
2012 KBS Entertainment Awards – Top Entertainer Award (Entertainment Weekly)
2011 12th Korea Visual Arts Festival – Photogenic Award, Movie Actor category
2011 18th Han Il Culture Awards – Grand Prize, Cultural Diplomacy category
2010 MBC Entertainment Awards – Special Award in Show/Variety (Enjoy Today)
2008 16th Chunsa Film Art Awards – Hallyu Cultural Award
2006 26th Hawaii International Film Festival – Asian Star Award
2006 27th Blue Dragon Film Awards – Popular Star Award (Barefoot Ki-bong)
2006 4th Korea Fashion World Awards – Best Dressed Award
2001 Best Dresser Swan Awards – Best Dressed, Movie Actor category
1999 Golden Disk Awards: Popular Music Video Award (Jo Sung-mo's For Your Soul'')
1992 30th Grand Bell Awards – Best New Actor

References

External links

 
 
 Shin Hyun-joon Fan Cafe at Daum
 Shin Hyun-joon at Star Brothers Entertainment
 
 
 
 Shin Hyun-jun Japanese website

1968 births
Living people
South Korean male film actors
South Korean male models
South Korean male television actors
Yonsei University alumni
Male actors from Seoul